The 2017 Guangzhou Evergrande Taobao season was the 64th year in Guangzhou Evergrande's existence and its 50th season in the Chinese football league, also its 28th season in the top flight. Guangzhou Evergrande won their seventh consecutive title of the league.

Coaching staff

Transfers

In

Winter

Summer

Out

Winter

Summer

Pre-season and friendlies

Training matches

Qiannan Cross-year Cup

Competitions

Chinese Super League

Table

Results by round

Results summary

Matches

Chinese FA Cup

Chinese FA Super Cup

AFC Champions League

Group stage

Knockout stage

Round of 16 

2–2 on aggregate. Guangzhou Evergrande won on away goals.

Quarter-finals 

5–5 on aggregate. Guangzhou Evergrande lost on penalty shoot-out.

Statistics

Appearances and goals

Goalscorers

Assists

Disciplinary record

References 

Guangzhou F.C.
Guangzhou F.C. seasons